The Tacoma pocket gopher (Thomomys mazama tacomensis), was a subspecies of the Mazama pocket gopher that was restricted to a few isolated populations in the southern Puget Sound area and on the Olympic Peninsula in Washington.  The animal became extinct in 1970.

References

Tacoma pocket gopher
Tacoma pocket gopher
Tacoma pocket gopher
Fauna of the Northwestern United States
Mammals of the United States
Tacoma pocket gopher
Rodents of North America
Tacoma pocket gopher
Tacoma pocket gopher